The Erbil Marathon is an annual marathon in Erbil, Kurdistan Region. The first marathon was held in 2011. The finish line is in Sami Abdulrahman Park.
athletes from around the world come and participate in the Marathon, it's held every October, every year.
The next Marathon is expected to be held in October 2021.

Results
Key:

References

Marathons in Iraq
Erbil
2011 establishments in Iraq